Clarence Shelmon (born September 17, 1952 in Bossier City, Louisiana) is the former offensive coordinator for the National Football League San Diego Chargers.

Shelmon prepped at Airline High School and continued on to play college football at the University of Houston, where he lettered twice as a running back and graduated with a bachelor's degree in education. Shelmon also attended Long Island University where he worked toward a master's degree in guidance and counseling.

On the college level, Shelmon was an assistant coach for the University of Southern California.  He also coached at the University of Arizona, Indiana University, Army, and the University of Houston. He then moved on to be the running backs coach for the Chargers, Dallas Cowboys, Seattle Seahawks and Los Angeles Rams. He was officially named the Chargers' offensive coordinator on January 27, 2007, replacing former coordinator Cam Cameron who was hired as the head coach of the Miami Dolphins. On January 10, 2012, Shelmon announced his retirement from football.

1975-1976 University of Houston (GA)
1979-1980 Army (RB/TE)
1981-1983 University of Indiana (RB)
1984-1986 University of Arizona (RB)
1987-1990 University of Southern California (RB)
1991 Los Angeles Rams (RB)
1992-1997 Seattle Seahawks (RB)
1998-2001 Dallas Cowboys (RB)
2002-2006 San Diego Chargers (RB)
2007-2009 San Diego Chargers (OC)

External links

1952 births
Living people
Sportspeople from Bossier City, Louisiana
American football running backs
Houston Cougars football players
Arizona Wildcats football coaches
Indiana Hoosiers football coaches
USC Trojans football coaches
Seattle Seahawks coaches
San Diego Chargers coaches
National Football League offensive coordinators